Baily's Monthly Magazine of Sports and Pastimes, and Racing Register, from 1889 Baily's Magazine of Sports and Pastimes, was a monthly magazine of horse racing and other equine pursuits. It was first published in 1860 by A.H. Baily & Company of Cornhill, London, until it was taken over by Vinton & Company in 1889. It ceased publication in 1926.

An Index, History and Bibliography of 390 pages, compiled by Chris Harte was published in 2017.

References

Monthly magazines published in the United Kingdom
Sports magazines published in the United Kingdom
English-language magazines
Horse racing in Great Britain
Magazines established in 1860
Magazines disestablished in 1926
Equine magazines
Magazines published in London
Defunct magazines published in the United Kingdom